Chip Young  (born Jerry Marvin Stembridge, May 19, 1938 – December 20, 2014) was an American session guitarist, and later record producer who worked primarily out of Nashville, Tennessee.

Biography
Chip Young was born Jerry Marvin Stembridge in Atlanta, Georgia and was famous for his thumb-style guitar picking. Young played on records by Eddy Arnold, Bobby Bare, J. J. Cale, Guy Clark, Skeeter Davis, Waylon Jennings, George Jones, Kris Kristofferson, Jerry Lee Lewis, Charlie Louvin, Charlie McCoy, Ronnie Milsap, Willie Nelson, The Oak Ridge Boys, Dolly Parton, Carl Perkins, Elvis Presley, Charley Pride, Leon Russell, Earl Scruggs, Nancy Sinatra, Tanya Tucker, Tony Joe White, and many more.

Discography

 Jesus Was a Capricorn, Kris Kristofferson, 1972
 Breakaway, Kris Kristofferson and Rita Coolidge, 1974
 Jolene, Dolly Parton, 1974
 Night Things, Ronnie Milsap, 1975
 Joe Ely, Joe Ely, 1977
 Honky Tonk Masquerade, Joe Ely, 1978
 Feel the Fire, Reba McEntire, 1980
 Heart to Heart, Reba McEntire, 1981
 One of a Kind, Moe Bandy, 1982 
 Unlimited, Reba McEntire, 1982
 Bobbie Sue,  The Oak Ridge Boys, 1982
 Behind the Scene, Reba McEntire, 1983
 American Made, The Oak Ridge Boys, 1983
 Just a Little Love, Reba McEntire, 1984
 Island in the Sea, Willie Nelson, 1987
 Just One Love, Willie Nelson, 1995
 Twistable, Turnable Man, a tribute album to Shel Silverstein, 2010

Producer and engineer discography
 I Can Help, Billy Swan, 1974
 I Came To Hear The Music, Mickey Newbury, 1974
 Joe Ely, Joe Ely, 1977
 Honky Tonk Masquerade, Joe Ely, 1978
 Gene Summers in Nashville, Gene Summers, 1980
 Hard Country, Michael Martin Murphey, 1981

References

1938 births
2014 deaths
American session musicians
American country guitarists
American male guitarists
People from Atlanta
American rock guitarists
Lead guitarists
20th-century American guitarists
Country musicians from Georgia (U.S. state)
20th-century American male musicians